Fergal Stapleton (born 1961 in Ireland) is an artist living and working in London.
Stapleton studied at Middlesex Polytechnic (now Middlesex University) and graduated from the MA Programme at Goldsmiths College, London in 1993.

Between 1994 and 1997 he collaborated on a number of works with Turner Prize nominee Rebecca Warren. He is represented by Carl Freedman Gallery.

Stuart Morgan (art critic) on Stapleton's 1993 show "His manner of entertaining us…the worst thing I have ever done."
(frieze (magazine), No. 10, May 1993):  'The logic of dandyism as a mode of conceptual art assumes a view of the dandy not as engaged in a foppish, decadent pursuit but as an attempt to get over class distinction by creating one's own aristocracy, doing what aristocrats do but doing it better, secure in the knowledge that their order and the natural superiority it implies is on a false premise.’

Stapleton has been an occasional lecturer on the MA Fine Art programmes at Goldsmiths College, University of London, Birmingham Institute of Art & Design, Birmingham City University, and the Slade School of Fine Art.  He has also contributed to the art review section of TimeOut magazine (Nos. 1418 & 1421–1425).

Stapleton is additionally the author of a novel titled After the Death of the Goat God (Key Principles in History 2)

Solo exhibitions (selected)
 Lo Ceremonial (Carl Freedman Gallery, 2016)
 2moro (Carl Freedman Gallery, 2014)
 dOr (Carl Freedman Gallery, 2010)
 If one good deed in all my life I did, I do repent it from my very soul (V22, London 2009)
 Art Show (in V22 Presents:The Wharf Rd Project 2008)
 And a Door Opened (Carl Freedman Gallery, 2007)
 Stapleton Grey (Carl Freedman Gallery, London, 2006)
 I Shall Arrive Soon (Carl Freedman Gallery, London, 2003)

Collaborations (selected)
 The Unadorned Hardcore World of the Anabolic Mutant in Stir (with Rebecca Warren, The Showroom, London 1997)

Group exhibitions (selected)
 Take a little walk to the edge of town and cross the tracks (Coombs Contemporary at Watson, Farley, Williams, London 2018)
 A Darkness More Than Night (QUAD Gallery, Derby 2012)
 The Shape We're In (Zabludowicz Collection, 176 Prince of Wales Rd, London 2011)
 Newspeak: British Art Now (Saatchi Gallery, Duke of York's HQ, London 2010))
 Newspeak: British Art Now (The State Hermitage Museum, St Petersburg 2009)

Curations
 The Real, (in V22 Presents:The Sculpture Show, The Biscuit Factory, London, 2009)

References

External links
Home is where the art is, The Guardian
Jonathan Jones, The Guardian
Andrew Bonacina, Frieze magazine
Rachel Withers, Artforum
Future Greats, Artreview
In the Studio, Time Out
Stapleton on Marc Camille Chaimowicz, Frieze magazine
JJ Charlesworth, Artreview
Seated Man, Frieze

1961 births
Living people
British artists
Alumni of Goldsmiths, University of London
British contemporary artists
Irish contemporary artists
Irish emigrants to the United Kingdom